Mallial is a village in Mallial mandal of Jagtial district in the state of Telangana in India.

Geography 
It has an average elevation of 316 meters (1040 feet). It is located at 214 km distance from its State main city Hyderabad.

References 

Villages in Jagtial district
Mandal headquarters in Jagtial district